Harriet Obias Demetriou is a Filipino lawyer and was the first female Chairperson of the Philippine election commission, the COMELEC, appointed by President Joseph Estrada. She was one of only four women appointed to the Philippine Election Commission.

Demetriou, the then-judge of Pasig regional trial court, was known to the public for handing down the March 1995 verdict against former Calauan, Laguna mayor Antonio Sanchez and six others (then-PNP Calauan Deputy Chief George Medialdea, Luis Corcolon, Rogelio "Boy" Corcolon, Zoilo Ama, Baldwin Brion, and Pepito Kawit) for the rape-slay of 21-year-old Mary Eileen Sarmenta and the killing of 19-year-old Allan Gomez in June 1993.

Comelec post
On January 11, 1999, she was appointed by President Estrada as Chairman of the Commission on Elections. After the events of January 2001 that led to the ouster of President Estrada from power, Demetriou tendered her courtesy resignation which was accepted by President Gloria Macapagal Arroyo.

Magdalo lawyer
Demetriou was the lead counsel for the core officers of the Magdalo Group, who led the siege on the Oakwood hotel on July 27, 2003.

See also
COMELEC

References

Justices of the Sandiganbayan
20th-century Filipino judges
Living people
Filipino women in politics
Filipino women lawyers
Filipino women judges
Chairpersons of the Commission on Elections of the Philippines
Estrada administration personnel
Year of birth missing (living people)
21st-century Filipino lawyers
20th-century women judges